The New Zealand cricket team toured England in the 2004 season to play a three-match Test series against England. The series was won 3–0 by England, the first time they had won a Test series between the two teams since 1997. During the tour New Zealand also played in the NatWest Series, which was a triangular One Day International tournament featuring the West Indies and England.

England were forced into a change of captain for the first match of the series after Michael Vaughan twisted his knee during batting practice. His departure meant that Marcus Trescothick was named as the stand-in captain and Andrew Strauss was called into the team to make his debut. After scoring 112 in the first innings, becoming only the fourth player to score a debut century at Lord's, and 83 in the second, Strauss was named the player of the match. The opening match of the series was also significant because it was the final match of former England captain Nasser Hussain's career, he made 103 not out in England's second innings and hit the winning runs.

The players of the series were named as Steve Harmison of England and Mark Richardson of New Zealand. Harmison took 21 wickets, nine more than any other bowler in the series, at an average of 22.09 with best innings figures of 4/74. Richardson was the highest run-scorer of the series, he finished with 369 runs at an average of 61.50 and a highest score of 101.

Test series

1st Test

2nd Test

3rd Test

References

2004 in English cricket
2004
International cricket competitions in 2004